Last Night the Moon Came Dropping Its Clothes in the Street is a studio album by Jon Hassell. It was released on ECM on February 10, 2009.

Track listing

Personnel
Credits adapted from liner notes.

Musicians
 Jon Hassell – trumpet, keyboards
 Peter Freeman – bass, laptop
 Jan Bang - live sampling
 Rick Cox – guitar
 Jamie Muhoberac – keyboard, laptop
 Kheir-Eddine M’Kachiche – violin
 Eivind Aarset – guitar
 Helge Norbakken – drum
 Pete Lockett – drums
 Dino J.A. Deane – live sampling

Technical personnel
 Manfred Eicher – production
 Jon Hassell – co-production
 Peter Freeman – co-production, editor, mixing engineer
 Sascha Kleis – design
 Gérald Minkoff – cover photo

References

External links
 

2009 albums
Jon Hassell albums